Carolin Widmann (born 1976) is a German classical violinist. The sister of composer and clarinetist Jörg Widmann, she focuses mainly on contemporary music. She plays a violin made in 1782 by Giovanni Battista Guadagnini.

Career 
Born in Munich, Widmann studied with Igor Ozim in Cologne, Michèle Auclair in Boston and David Takeno in London. As a soloist she has been conducted by Sir Roger Norrington, Sylvain Cambreling, Heinz Holliger, Riccardo Chailly, Sir Simon Rattle, Vladimir Jurowski, Daniel Harding and Esa-Pekka Salonen. She has collaborated with composers such as Pierre Boulez, Peter Eötvös, Erkki-Sven Tüür, Wolfgang Rihm, Salvatore Sciarrino, Enno Poppe and Rebecca Saunders, who have written several works especially for her. She has performed with orchestras such as Berlin Philharmonic Orchestra, Orchestre de Paris, Royal Stockholm Philharmonic Orchestra, Sydney Symphony Orchestra or Los Angeles Philharmonic Orchestra.

Since October 2006 she has been Professor of Violin at the University of Music and Theatre Leipzig. From 2012 to 2015 she ran the Sommerliche Musiktage Hitzacker, Germany's oldest chamber music festival.

At the Salzburg Mozartwoche of 2009, Widmann performed chamber music by Boulez with her brother and pianist Hidéki Nagano. She attracted attention with her collaboration in gefaltet, a "Choreographic concert" organised by Sasha Waltz and Mark Andre, with which the International Mozarteum Foundation opened their Mozartwoche of 2012. A 2012 recording of Schubert's works for violin and piano with Alexander Lonquich received critical acclaim. With her brother and pianist Dénes Várjon she played a concert at the Rheingau Musik Festival when he was artist in residence in 2014.

Awards 
 1998 Prix du President at the "Concours International Yehudi Menuhin," Boulogne-sur-Mer
 1999 International Violin Competition: "Georg Kulenkampff", Köln
 2001 International Jeunesses Musicales Contest, Belgrade
 2004 Belmont Prize of the Forberg-Schneider-Stiftung for excellence in contemporary music
 2006 Annual Preis der deutschen Schallplattenkritik (for the debut album "Reflections“)
 2010 Diapason d’Or (for "Phantasy of Spring"), Preis der deutschen Schallplattenkritik (Chamber music category for "Phantasy of Spring")
 2013 'Artist of the Year' at the International Classical Music Awards
 2014 Schneider-Schott Music Prize of the City of Mainz
 2017 
 2020 Duisburger Musikpreis

Discography 
 2006 Carolin Widmann: "Reflections" (Debut album)
 2008 Carolin Widmann / Dénes Várjon: Schumann – Violin Sonatas
 2009 Carolin Widmann / Simon Lepper: Phantasy of Spring – Feldman, Zimmermann, Schoenberg
 2009 Carolin Widmann / Jörg Widmann / Nordic Symphony Orchestra / Anu Tali: Erkki-Sven Tüür, Strata
 2012 Alexander Lonquich / Carolin Widmann: Franz Schubert – Fantasie C-Dur / Rondo h-moll / Sonate A-Dur
 2012 Carolin Widmann / SWR Sinfonieorchester Baden-Baden und Freiburg / Eivind Gullberg Jensen: Wolfgang Rihm, Coll’Arco
 2013 Carolin Widmann / Frankfurt RSO-Pomarico: Morton Feldman – Violin and Orchestra (composed 1979)
 2015 Carolin Widmann / London Philharmonic Orchestra, Direction Vladimir Jurowski: Julian Anderson: In lieblicher Bläue 
 2016 Carolin Widmann / Chamber Orchestra of Europe: Mendelssohn, Schumann: Violin concertos
 2016 Martin Helmchen / Carolin Widmann / David McCarroll / Pauline Sachse / Marie-Elisabeth Hecker: Edward Elgar: Piano Quintet a minor op. 84
 2017 Carolin Widmann / Orchestre National des Pays de la Loire / Direction Pascal Rophe: Pascal Dusapin: Violin concerto „Aufgang“, Label BIS
 2019 Carolin Widmann / Sergei Nakariakov /   / Vocalconsort Berlin /  Symphonieorchester des Bayerischen Rundfunks: Peter Ruzicka: ... Inseln, Randlos... for violin, chamber choir and orchestra; Label Neos

References

External links 
 
 
 List of the Schumann Album on MusicWeb International
 Interview on Classical WETA 90.9 
 Strap-CD onswr.de

German classical violinists
Academic staff of the University of Music and Theatre Leipzig
1976 births
Living people
21st-century classical violinists
Women classical violinists
21st-century German musicians
21st-century German women musicians
Musicians from Munich